Streptomyces noboritoensis is a bacterium species from the genus of Streptomyces which has been isolated from soil in Japan. Streptomyces noboritoensis produces elasnin, noboritomycin A, noboritomycin B, blastomycin and hygromycin. Streptomyces noboritoensis also produces melanomycin, 1-hydroxysulffurmycin B and 5-hydroxymaltol.

Further reading

See also 
 List of Streptomyces species

References

External links
Type strain of Streptomyces noboritoensis at BacDive -  the Bacterial Diversity Metadatabase	

noboritoensis
Bacteria described in 1957